Clive Neville Ross Mansell (born 20 April 1953) is a British Anglican priest who was Archdeacon of Tonbridge from 2002 until 31 July 2017.

Mansell was educated at the City of London School, the University of Leicester and Trinity College, Bristol. After an earlier career as a solicitor he was ordained deacon in 1982 and priest in 1983. After a curacy at Great Malvern Priory he was a Minor Canon at Ripon Cathedral from 1985 to 1989. He was then Rector of Kirklington from 1989 to 2002; and Area Dean of Wensley from 1998 to 2002.

References
 

1953 births
Living people
Alumni of the University of Leicester
Alumni of Trinity College, Bristol
Archdeacons of Tonbridge
People educated at the City of London School
English solicitors